Gravel & Wine is the second album from New Zealand pop singer Gin Wigmore, released in New Zealand on 7 November 2011. The album was recorded in Santa Monica, California during the second quarter of 2011 under producer Butch Walker and counting with his backing band, The Black Widows. Before production begun, Wigmore travelled for two months in  Mississippi and Alabama to get a Southern United States inspiration.

The first single from the album "Black Sheep", and was released 26 September 2011, debuting at #13 in the Official New Zealand Music Chart. The album was released on 7 November 2011. It debuted at number 1, and received a Recorded Music NZ double platinum certification, meaning over 15,000 units sold.

Wigmore released music videos for "Man Like That" and "If Only". Wigmore's single "Black Sheep" was featured in a trailer for Orange Is the New Black, and it appeared in episode 12, season 8 of Grey's Anatomy, in episode 2, season 2 of Teen Wolf, and in episode 5, season 5 of The Good Wife. She also appeared singing it on "Gift of Revenge", a segment of ABC's television show Revenge season 2, episode 7. "Kill of the Night" was featured in various media, including another episode of Teen Wolf:  it plays during the 2015 film Spy, was featured on the TV show 666 Park Avenue, and as well as being the theme song for the cable channel AMC 's annual airing of Halloween movies and shows titled FearFest. "Man Like That" is the song used in the James Bond Skyfall tie-in spot from Heineken; Wigmore herself is seen performing the song towards the end of it. The advertisement also featured many Bond stars from various Bond movies.

Gravel & Wine was released in the U.S. on 2 April 2013, and debuted at 87 on the Billboard 200, with over 6,000 units sold. Wigmore promoted her North American debut by opening for Phillip Phillips, and afterwards appearing on the entire 2013 Vans Warped Tour.

Background
In September 2011, Wigmore revealed the title and release of her new album Gravel & Wine on her official Facebook page.

Promotion
The first single was slated to be "Black Sheep"; it was released 26 September 2011 and peaked at #13. The album was released on 7 November 2011. It debuted at #29 on the Australian Albums Chart. Wigmore released music videos for "Man Like That" and "If Only".

Gravel & Wine was released in the U.S. on 2 April 2013.

Critical reception
Lydia Jenkins of The New Zealand Herald gave the album a 4.5/5 star review. "The whole album sees (Wigmore) taking the drama and character that made Holy Smoke track Hey Ho so successful, and extending it whole-heartedly with terrific results. Turns out Gin's ageing nicely, just like a good wine."

AllMusic gave the album a 3.5/5 star review with a user rating of 4/5 stars. Steve Leggett describe the album as "a huge-sounding dance-pop album full of songs geared for both the dancefloor and the radio stations that drive people to go there, all big, stomping drums and kinetic high vocals about men who don't measure up, jealous girls, and the trashy, dangerous side of love and other hazards."

Sputnikmusic gave the album a 3/5 rating, with a review summary "It's pretty much a kitchen sink piece of pastiche."

Track listing

Personnel
Gin Wigmore - vocals, drums, guitar, mandolin, organ, percussion

The Black Widows
Butch Walker – production, vocals
Fran Capitanelli – guitars, percussion, backing vocals
Jake Sinclair – bass guitar, drums, keyboards, backing vocals

Others
Eric Rosse – piano, production in "Saturday Smile"
Rob Mathes – string arrangements and conduction
Claudius Mittendorfer – mixing

Charts

Weekly charts

Year-end charts

Release history

References

2011 albums
Gin Wigmore albums
Albums produced by Butch Walker